Hushang Irani (1925 in Hamedan – 4 September 1973 in Paris) was an Iranian poet, translator, critics, journalist and painter. He is one of the pioneers of "The New Poetry" and surrealism in Iran.

The Fighting Cock days
Founded in 1950, Khorus Jangi (The Fighting Cock) was a small artistic group that published a journal by same title. In the beginning, Khorus Jangi was not significantly different from other literary journals of the time. A year later, however, Hushang Irani, the enfant terrible of modernist Persian poetry, joined the group. Under his influence, the journal was transformed into a radical modernist literary journal. It published Irani'''s poems, which no other literary journal of the day, and even almost no literary critics on those days, would dare to acknowledge as poetry. Irani'' has shrewdly observed and anxiously realized how the potentials that Nima had introduced into Persian poetry were being co-opted: Nima and modernist Persian poetry were in the process of becoming mainstream. Understanding this double edge of youthful tradition, Irani had both praised and condemned Nima.

Works

Books
Poetry
Spicy Violet on Grey, Tehran, September 1951
 Grey, Tehran, June 1952
I think all about you now, I think about all of you now, Tehran, January 1956
Designs
Some Designs, Tehran, April 1952
Critical Essays
Understanding of art: In the way to a worldview in art, Tehran, January 1952
A letter to Mr. Hussein Kazem-zade Iranshahr: about his collection "Confucius" that he published in Tehran, Tehran, 1956

Gallery
From the book "Some Designs", Tehran, April 1952

References

External links
 Hushang Irani on Google books

1925 births
1973 deaths
20th-century Iranian poets
Iranian journalists
Iranian translators
People from Hamadan
20th-century translators
20th-century poets
20th-century journalists
Burials at Behesht-e Zahra